Jackson Fred Ogwang (born 16 June 1959) is a Ugandan long-distance runner. He competed in the men's marathon at the 1988 Summer Olympics.

References

External links
 

1959 births
Living people
Athletes (track and field) at the 1988 Summer Olympics
Ugandan male long-distance runners
Ugandan male marathon runners
Olympic athletes of Uganda
Place of birth missing (living people)